The Free Province of Guayaquil was a South American state that emerged between 1820 and 1822 with the independence of the province of Guayaquil from the Spanish monarchy. The free province had a provisional government and constitution until its annexation by Gran Colombia in 1822. Its successor was the Department of Guayaquil forming part of Gran Colombia. The Spanish province of Guayaquil was separated from the Viceroyalty of Peru and in those days it only depended legally on the court of the Real Audiencia de Quito. About a decade later, the Departments of Guayaquil, Azuay and Ecuador separated from Gran Colombia forming the current Ecuador.

The Free Province of Guayaquil included the same territories as the Government of Guayaquil in the Spanish colony, including land from Esmeraldas to the north and to Tumbes to the south, and between the Pacific Ocean to the west and the foothills of the Andes mountain range to the east. It encompassed a large part of the Ecuadorian coast, the current Ecuadorian provinces of Guayas, Santa Elena, Manabí, most of the provinces of Los Ríos, El Oro, Cañar, part of the south of Esmeraldas, and Tumbes in modern Peru.

History

Independence of Guayaquil and Revolution of October 9

Provisional Government Regulation 
After the independence revolution in Guayaquil on Monday, October 9, 1820, several municipalities immediately joined the emancipatory cause: Samborondón on the 10th, Daule on the 11th and Naranjal on the 15th.  Twenty-three days later, on Wednesday, November 8, convened by the Guayaquil city council, the 57 representatives of all the city councils of the new State installed the Electoral College or Congress of the Free Province of Guayaquil, an organization that dictated its electoral statute or constitution of the province called "Provisional Government Regulations," which was the first constitution that would govern the legal destinies of this State and whose first article said:

The Provisional Regulation of the State of Guayaquil governed the aforementioned territory between its independence from Spain and its annexation to Gran Colombia. It was the first constitution with the force of law and its congress the first constituent assembly held in territory independent of the Real Audiencia de Quito. It confirmed the ambiguous and provisional condition of the new State with respect to its legal status.

Its main points contained elements of republicanism such as the division of powers and equality before the law, and of liberalism such as free trade, Manchester pacifism, voluntary military service (except in case of war) and the right to choose future political status; the establishment of the Catholic religion is the official religion the only conservative aspect that is found in the political letter.

At the time referred to universal suffrage was not yet established, so there was no democratic representation by general election and the process of election and control of the congress was through the self-appointed "Junta de gobierno" system (see Juntismo and Oligarchy). In a similar way to the process of independence of the other American colonies, those who were left in charge of public functions and the political power of the provisional State, through the Electoral College, were men belonging to the Criollo elites, that is, high officials and high-society characters from this region of the colony who made up a Junta de Notables.

The Fundamental Charter of the State handed over power to a triumvirate made up of Olmedo, Ximena and Roca. Messengers were immediately sent to Simón Bolívar and José de San Martín, as well as to the cities of the Sierra.

In the nascent republic (subsequent Republic of Ecuador) laws were approved in favor of slaves, such as that the children of slaves were free.

Military geopolitics of independence and Protective Division of Quito 

The Guayaquil revolutionaries were convinced that their first objective should be the liberation of the Quito mountain range and they advanced, defeating the royalists, on November 9, in the Battle of Camino Real near Guaranda. According to some historical studies, it can be deduced that the rulers of the already sovereign Province of Guayaquil probably aspired to the creation of an independent republic in the territories of the Real Audiencia of Quito (to which the Province belonged), under the name of "Republic of Quito" and they aspired that their capital would be Santiago de Guayaquil. However, and like other considerations regarding the independence of Guayaquil, there is no unanimous opinion among historians.

The State of Guayaquil, for continental statesmen and American military strategists of the time, had no place in the post-independence political order. This was probably also foreseen by the members of the Junta, who had told both Simón Bolívar and José de San Martín that the Province would be added to any of the States that were to be organized after the chaos of the independence campaigns. What they asked was that they be allowed to choose.

In any case, without the independence of the territories of the Real Audiencia, the very independence of the nascent state of Guayaquil could not be certain. This was stated by the Venezuelan officer León de Febres-Cordero (who participated in the independence), quoted by José de Villamil:

General Antonio José de Sucre arrived in Guayaquil with a Colombian support force of 700 armed and equipped men in August 1821, and fought alongside the people of Guayaquil against the Spanish who were still endangering the independence of the province in the Yaguachi are (current province of Guayas). The Guayaquil-Colombian coalition commanded by Sucre triumphed in the Battle of Yaguachi, definitively ensuring the independence of the Free Province of Guayaquil. After the victory, Sucre asked the people of Guayaquil for help to complete the emancipation of the other departments that made up the Real Audiencia and bring independence to Cuenca and Quito, a process that Olmedo supported from start to finish.

For this purpose, the Guayaquil government established the Protective Division of Quito with 1,500 men. Together with the Colombian armies, they attacked the royalist troops established in the Audiencia and completed total emancipation on May 24, 1822, in the Battle of Pichincha, where the flag of Guayaquil was waved next to the banners of the Gran Colombian state.

The Battle of Pichincha 
Guayaquil contributed to the absolute liberation of Quito (now Ecuador). Simón Bolívar and his forces, who often receive credit for the victory, were not present during the battle. An excerpt from the Patriota de Guayaquil, the first Guayaquil newspaper and the main spokesperson for the Government of the Free Province, shows that that battle waged on the slopes of the Pichincha volcano was not only the glory of Colombia and Peru, but that Guayaquil also deserves the credit for that victory that consolidated the total independence of Ecuador:

Bolívar's coup d'état and forced annexation to Gran Colombia 

Prior to the interview in Guayaquil, and officially on the occasion of it, on July 11, 1822, Bolívar arrived in the capital city of the Free State (Santiago de Guayaquil) and was received by the Guayaquil population under the cheers of "Viva Colombia," "Long live Bolívar" and "Long live Peru," expressing independence solidarity with the American peoples. Some historians see in these public expressions an annexationist desire toward Colombia or Peru and other states that the Guayaquil government intended to remain sovereign.

Bolívar considered Guayaquil a point of entry for Peru, which was the last region without independence in South America and the largest royalist bastion, for which he considered the annexation of the Province to the Republic of Colombia strategic (previously, the Quito council had already declared its annexation to Colombia). General Bolívar, backed by a strong military contingent, staged a coup d'état, proclaiming himself Supreme Chief of the Province and decreed the annexation to Gran Colombia, ignoring the government presided over by Olmedo. The annexation of Guayaquil to Gran Colombia caused the self-exile of Olmedo, who in a letter informed Simón Bolívar of his disagreement with the measures adopted by his government.

A few days later, Simón Bolívar received José de San Martín, in his capacity as Head of the Government of the Province. According to historical documents, in the interview in Guayaquil the two characters discussed, among other various issues, the way to end the emancipatory war in Peru and the form of government that was convenient for the American States. While San Martín leaned towards a monarchical regime, with constitutional characteristics, Bolívar was in favor of a democratic republic. The interview did not include the fate of the Province among its points, as is often wrongly stated.

On July 31, 1822, the Free Province of Guayaquil declared its official annexation to Gran Colombia. For this reason, Guayaquil became the District of the South of the Colombian state together with the Department of Ecuador with capital in Quito and the Department of Azuay with capital in Cuenca, under the name of Department of Guayaquil with capital in the City of Guayaquil.

General Pedro Gual's plan on how to proceed with Guayaquil if it was not annexed to Gran Colombia 
Faced with the refusal of the Guayaquil government to be annexed to Bolivarian Colombia, the Venezuelan Pedro Gual sent a letter to Bolívar—which did not reach him until after the annexation in July 1822—detailing a plan to put pressure on the city government and take over the region of what is now Manabí, whose annexation to the northern country he saw as the best outcome. The plan that the Venezuelan elaborated was the following:

See Also 

 Flag of Guayaquil
 Coat of arms of Guayaquil
 Canción al Nueve de Octubre
 List of former sovereign states

References

Bibliography 

 El 9 de octubre y la importancia de Guayaquil en la consolidación de la independencia americana, Efrén Avilés Pino, Revista Pódium, 2006.
Independence movements
Guayaquil
1820s in Ecuador